Paludibacter is a Gram-negative, strictly anaerobic, chemoorganotrophic and non-motile genus from the phylum Bacteroidota.

References

Further reading 
 
 

Bacteroidia
Bacteria genera